Silvina Noelia Luna Stavrópulos (born June 21, 1980) is an Argentinian model, actress and vedette born in Rosario, Santa Fe Province, Argentina.

Career
After finishing school at the age of 17, she moved to Buenos Aires and worked as a secretary and a model. She later lived in Miami for a year, before returning to Argentina, where she appeared as a participant on Big Brother 2.

She currently works with the modeling agency of Ricardo Piñeiro.

She has taken theatre classes with Julio Chávez, and has guest-starred on some TV shows.

She is currently participating in the reality diving competition Celebrity Splash!

In July 2014 she was hospitalized with kidney stones. She blamed her cosmetic surgeon for the problem because of the use of methacrylate on her buttocks.

Magazine appearances
 Cover of the Argentinian Maxim magazine
 Cover of Interviú magazine
 Pages of Harper's Bazaar
 Pages of Vogue

Theater shows
 Vedettísima (2009)
 El Champagne las Pone Mimosas. (2005)
 Diferente. (2003)
 La noche de las pistolas frías. (2002)

Selected TV appearances
 El hotel de los famosos (2022)
 Gran Hermano 2011 (2011)
 El Capo (2007)
 Son de Fierro (2007)
 Bailando por un sueño (2006)
 Los Gladiadores de Pompeya (2006)
 Amor en Custodia (2005)
 Quién es el Jefe? (2005)
 El Patrón de la Vereda (2005)
 Don Francisco Presenta (2004)
 No Hay 2 Sin 3 (2004)
 Los Roldán (2004)
 La Peluquería (2003)
 Gran Hermano 2 - Big Brother Argentina 2 (2001; participant)

References

External links
 

1980 births
Living people
Argentine female models
Argentine actresses
Gran Hermano (Argentine TV series) contestants
Association footballers' wives and girlfriends
People from Rosario, Santa Fe
Argentine vedettes
Argentine people of Spanish descent
Argentine musical theatre actresses
21st-century Argentine women
Participants in Argentine reality television series
Bailando por un Sueño (Argentine TV series) participants